Vida is an American drama television series created by Tanya Saracho and inspired by the short story "Pour Vida" by Richard Villegas Jr. The series stars Melissa Barrera, Mishel Prada, Ser Anzoategui, Chelsea Rendon, Carlos Miranda, Maria-Elena Laas, and Roberta Colindrez. Vida tells the story of two Mexican-American sisters who move back to their childhood home in Boyle Heights, Los Angeles after the death of their mother.

Vida premiered on May 6, 2018, on Starz. The series was renewed by Starz for a third season less than a week after the second season's debut. In March 2020, it was announced that the third season would be the final season as Starz had cancelled the program. The third season premiered on April 26, 2020.

Vida received critical acclaim. Each season holds a 100% score on review aggregator Rotten Tomatoes. The program received a 2019 GLAAD Media Award for Outstanding Comedy Series.

Premise
Vida follows "two Mexican-American sisters, Emma and Lyn, from the Eastside of Los Angeles who couldn't be more different or distanced from each other. Circumstances force them to return to their old neighborhood, where they are confronted by the past and shocking truth about their mother's identity."

Cast and characters

Main
 Melissa Barrera as Lynda "Lyn" Hernandez, a free-spirited vegan woman who dated mostly wealthy Caucasian men in San Francisco and who moves back home to Boyle Heights, Los Angeles after the death of her mother.
 Mishel Prada as Emma Hernandez, a type-A personality queer woman with a high-paying corporate executive job in Chicago who moves back to Boyle Heights, Los Angeles after the death of her mother. She is Lyn's older sister.
 Ser Anzoategui as Edwina "Eddy" Martínez, the butch widow of Lyn and Emma's mother, Vida, and co-owner of the bar.
 Chelsea Rendon as Marisol "Mari" Sanchez, an activist who wants to preserve her community from gentrification. She is Johnny's little sister.
 Carlos Miranda as Johnny Sanchez, a mechanic and Lyn's former high school flame with whom she has an on and off relationship.
 Maria Elena Laas as Cruz (seasons 1–2), Emma's friend and former love interest.
 Roberta Colindrez as Nico (seasons 2–3), Emma's love interest and bartender at Vida.

Recurring
 Elena Campbell-Martínez as Doña Lupe, a woman who lives in the Hernandez sister's building who practices santerie 
 Ramses Jimenez as Tlaloc Medina, an activist in the same group as Mari who is also her love interest
 Luis Bordonada as Nelson Herrera, the man who wants to buy Lyn, Emma, and Eddy's bar and who sexually harassed Emma.
 Elizabeth De Razzo as Yoli, Mari's best friend and fellow activist.
 Renée Victor as Doña Tita
 Adelina Anthony as Rocky, Eddy's friend.
 Erika Soto as Karla, the mother of Johnny's child
 Vanessa Giselle as Lucky aka "Femme"
 Raúl Castillo as Baco (season 2), the new handyman for the bar. Emma uses him for sex.
 Adrian Gonzalez as Rudy (season 2–3), Lyn's love interest who is a city councilman
 Tonatiuh as Marcos, a queer man and PhD holder who is friends with Cruz and moves into Lyn and Emma's building

Episodes

Season 1 (2018)

Season 2 (2019)

Season 3 (2020)

Production

Development
On January 8, 2016, the series was first announced as being in development at the Television Critics Association press tour in Pasadena, California, during Starz's executive session. The show was announced alongside two other projects based on Spanish-language formats and stories from Hispanic creators. The series, then titled Pour Vida, was inspired by the short story of the same name by Richard Villegas Jr. Executive producers were set to include Marc Turtletaub, Dan Pasternack, and Erin Keating. Production companies involved with the series were slated to consist of Big Beach.

On September 13, 2017, it was announced that Starz had given the show, now entitled Vida, a series order. Executive producers for the series were now expected to include Turtletaub, Tanya Saracho, Peter Saraf, and Robin Schwartz. Saracho was also set to serve as showrunner for the series and Alonso Ruizpalacios was set to direct the first episode. Upon joining the production, Saracho assembled an all-Latino writers' room — with writers who were all female-identified except for one cisgender male and half of whom identified as queer. Similarly, the casting director, composer, and editor of the series were also all female and Latina. The queerness came from me. I identify as queer, and it had to be there."

On January 12, 2018, it was announced at the annual Television Critics Association winter press tour that the series would premiere on May 6, 2018. On June 12, 2018, it was reported that Starz had renewed the series for a second season. The 10–episode second season will be released on Starz on Demand, StarzPlay and Starz app on May 23, 2019, ahead of its official premiere on May 26, 2019. On May 31, 2019, the series was renewed for a third season which premiered on April 26, 2020. On March 18, 2020, it was reported that Starz had cancelled the program and the third season would be the final season.

Casting

Alongside the series order announcement, it was announced that Melissa Barrera and Veronica Osorio had been cast as Lyn and Emma, respectively. On November 14, 2017, Ser Anzoategui, Chelsea Rendon, Carlos Miranda, and Maria Elena Laas were announced as having joined the series' main cast. It was also announced that Mishel Prada had replaced Veronica Osorio in the role of Emma. On December 8, 2017, the final additions to the cast were announced. These consisted of the castings of Elena Campbell-Martínez, Ramsés Jiménez, Luis Bordonada, Elizabeth De Razzo, Renee Victor, Adelina Anthony, and Erika Soto in recurring roles.

On July 28, 2018, it was announced that Roberta Colindrez had joined the main cast for season two. On August 15, 2018, it was reported that Raúl Castillo and Adrian Gonzalez had been cast in recurring roles for season two.

Filming
Principal photography for season one took place in the Pico-Union area of Los Angeles. Though the series is set in the Boyle Heights neighborhood, filming was moved to Pico-Union as residents of Boyle Heights raised concern over possible gentrification that might have been caused by the series presence.

Language
The dialogue in the series was written in Spanglish, like much of Saracho's theater work, and code switches in a way that is natural to many Hispanics, including Saracho. Though, as Saracho's background is Texan rather than Californian, members of the writers' room from Eastside Los Angeles ensured that the terms were true to the characters and not skewed by Spanglish more natural to Americans of Cuban and Puerto Rican backgrounds.

Release

Marketing
The first teaser trailer was released on February 8, 2018. On March 10, Starz opened the "Starz Sensory House" at the annual South by Southwest Film Festival in Austin, Texas. The "sensory house" featured a multitude of screens playing the trailers for both new shows on a loop. Various types of food and drinks were available and designed thematically to Vida and other new Starz series Sweetbitter. In keeping with the theme of Vida, Spanish-style tapas were served throughout the event, including mini tostadas, Korean hangar steak kabobs, and bite-sized crème brûlées. Additionally, a series of six artisanal cocktails were also available, designed by Austin-based bartender Tracy Rowland. One such cocktail based on Vida included the "Chingonia", a mix of Blanco tequila, vermouth, aloe, white wine, and garnished with basil and cucumber. A musical element was also included through the all-female DJ collective Chulita Vinyl Club that performed. The Starz Sensory House was located at 88 Rainey Street in Austin and operated until March 12.

Premiere
On March 11, 2018, the series held its world premiere at the annual South by Southwest Film Festival in Austin, Texas at Austin Convention Center in the Vimeo Theater. Following the screening, Fawzia Mirza moderated a question-and-answer session with showrunner and executive producer Tanya Saracho along with cast members Melissa Barrera, Mishel Prada, Ser Anzoategui, Chelsea Rendon, Carlos Miranda, and Maria Elena Laas.

Reception

Critical response
The first season received a positive response from critics upon its premiere. On the review aggregation website Rotten Tomatoes, the series holds a 100% approval rating, the first season has an average rating of 8.06 out of 10, based on 39 reviews. The website's critical consensus for season one reads, "Vida explores familiar familial ground from a fresh perspective to create an earnest and heartfelt take on identity and what it means to belong." Metacritic, which uses a weighted average, assigned the series a score of 75 out of 100 based on 12 critics, indicating "generally favorable reviews".

In a positive review, Voxs Caroline Framke awarded the series four "V"s out of five and praised the performances saying, "Every actor on Vida is great; Barrera's performance in particular blooms with searing clarity as Lyn is forced to face her own reckless choices. But it's Prada's Emma who becomes both the backbone and the beating heart of Vida as she grapples with her mother's truth and the painful reality of learning it too late." In a further approving editorial, Entertainment Weeklys Kristen Baldwin gave the series a "B" grade and commended it saying, "Vida is, remarkably, still a rarity on English-language TV: A show about Latinos made by a Latino. But the show's themes — gentrification, generational bias, and the surreal disconnect of returning to your childhood home after forging a new identity elsewhere — are universal, and Vida clips along nicely thanks to strong performances, including Chelsea Rendon's fierce and funny portrayal of guerrilla activist Marisol, and Prada's composed intensity as Emma." In a similarly enthusiastic critique, Deadline Hollywoods Dominic Patten complimented the series saying, "From its opening episode helmed by Alonso Ruizpalacios, the half-hour series also rejects barriers, slaps stereotypes silly and triumphantly spotlights several worlds you may not know that well but are vital parts of the cultural fabric of our time and country."

Awards and nominations

References

External links
 
 Vida on Starz

2010s American drama television series
2010s American LGBT-related drama television series
2018 American television series debuts
2020 American television series endings
2020s American drama television series
2020s American LGBT-related drama television series
Bisexuality-related television series
English-language television shows
Hispanic and Latino American television
Lesbian-related television shows
Starz original programming
Television shows set in Los Angeles
Works about gentrification